On the Water may  refer to:
On the Water (magazine), an American fishing and boating magazine
On the Water (novel), a 1998 novel by Hans Maarten van den Brink
On the Water (album), a 2011 album by Future Islands
On the Water (film), a 2020 film

See also
On the Waters, a 1970 album by Bread